Mode ( meaning "manner, tune, measure, due measure, rhythm, melody") may refer to:

Arts and entertainment 
 MODE (magazine), a defunct U.S. women's fashion magazine 
 Mode magazine, a fictional fashion magazine which is the setting for the ABC series Ugly Betty
 Mode (video game), a 1996 video game 
 Mode Records, a record label
 Mode Media, a defunct digital media company
 Mode series, a quartet of novels by Piers Anthony
 Modern Organization for Dance Evolvement, known as MODE, a 1970s modern dance organisation in New York
 Mode, a defunct Indonesian women's magazine

Music
 Mode (music), a system of musical tonality involving a type of scale coupled with a set of characteristic melodic behaviors
 Modus (medieval music)
 Gregorian mode, a system of modes used in Gregorian chant (as opposed to ancient Greek modes or Byzantine octoechos)
 "Mode", a song by PRhyme from the 2015 soundtrack Southpaw: Music from and Inspired by the Motion Picture

Computing 
 Data types in some programming languages
 MODE (command), a DOS and Windows command line utility for the configuration of devices and the console
 Mode (user interface), distinct method of operation within a computer system, in which the same user input can produce different results depending on the state of the system
 A game mode, a mode used as a game mechanic in video games
 Digital camera modes
 Direct mode, a software configuration where text input is processed outside of an application
 Immediate mode (computer graphics), a graphic library where commands produce direct rendering on the display
 Modes (Unix), permissions given to users and groups to access files and folders on Unix hosts

Language
 Grammatical mood, also known as mode, a category of verbal inflections that expresses an attitude of mind
 Imperative mood
 Subjunctive mood
 Mode (literature), the general category of a literary work, e.g. the pastoral mode
 Rhetorical modes, a category of discourse
 Narrative mode, the type of method voice and point of view used to convey a narrative
 Modes of persuasion, oratorical devices

Mathematics
 Mode (statistics), the most common value among a group
 Modes of convergence, a property of a series

Places
 Mode, Banmauk, a village in Burma
 Mode, Illinois, an unincorporated community in Shelby County, Illinois, United States

Science
 Mode (electromagnetism)
 Hybrid mode, such as longitudinal-section mode
 Normal mode, patterns of vibration in acoustics, electromagnetic theory, etc.
 Longitudinal mode
 Transverse mode
 Global mode
 Quasinormal mode, a type of energy dissipation of a perturbed object or field
 Starvation mode, a biological condition

Other uses
 Amateur radio modes
 Fashion
 IL Mode, a former name of Bærum SK, a Norwegian association football club
 Mode of transport, a means of transportation
 A technocomplex of stone tools
 Mode of production, a Marxist term for way of producing goods
, several ships of the Swedish Navy

See also 
 Asynchronous Transfer Mode, a method of digital communication
 Block cipher mode of operation, in cryptography
 The Devil's Mode, a collection of short stories by Anthony Burgess
 Edna Mode, a fictional character in Pixar's animated superhero film The Incredibles
 Explosive Mode, a 1998 album by San Quinn and Messy Marv
 Modal (disambiguation)
 Modality (disambiguation)